"Walking Wounded" is a song by Canadian rock band The Tea Party. It was released as a promotional single in Canada. The music video was shot in Havana.

"Walking Wounded" is a complex composition and features a choral, and string quartet (conducted by Marc Ouellette), it was written when the band were penning material for The Interzone Mantras. The song used 72 recording tracks. In an interview Jeff Martin claimed the song was about "..a time in his life that [he is] glad that it is over."

Charts

Track listing 
"Walking Wounded"

References

External links
 "Walking Wounded" Music video

2000 singles
The Tea Party songs
2000 songs
EMI Records singles